The Autostrada A10, also known as the Autostrada dei Fiori or the AutoFiori ("fiori" meaning "flowers" in Italian), is an Italian motorway, passing through Liguria and connecting Genoa with Ventimiglia. It connects to the French A8 autoroute, which finishes in Aix-en-Provence, and forms part of European route E80.

History

The route from Genoa to Savona was opened on 5 September 1967, and the route from Savona to Ventimiglia was opened on 6 November 1971.

Between Genoa and Savona, the highway has been improved three times in recent times: the northern route, in the direction of Ventimiglia, has been renovated, while the opposite direction, towards Genoa, is now the original road, which formerly consisted of both directions.

The route between Savona and the Italian border, on the other hand, is completely new, having been built in the sixties; it consists of two carriageways side by side, with two lanes in each direction. It has, however, no emergency lane, but includes several places in which it is suitable to make an emergency stop.

On 14 August 2018, a section of the Ponte Morandi bridge that formed part of the A10 collapsed during a storm, killing 43 people.

The Autostrada today

The route is currently run by two companies: from Genoa to Savona, by the company Autostrade Italy SpA, and from Savona to the border by Autostrada dei Fiori SpA. It has 22 entrances, and includes eight service stations.

Much of the route is built on hillside, with a series of viaducts and tunnels; for this reason, the entire motorway requires paying a toll charge (one of the most expensive in Italy). Past Savona, the motorway visits Albenga, Imperia, San Remo, and Ventimiglia: six kilometres from Ventimiglia, it reaches the border with France. Until the nineties, the border was marked by a change of stripe colour, from yellow to white, alongside a sign in the tunnel indicating the precise location of the border—this is now gone, although its former location can still be discerned from a change of lighting systems, and the different thicknesses of asphalt.

In the opposite direction, the A10 intersects with the A6, towards Turin, the A26, towards the Po Valley, Switzerland, and other major cities in the north of Italy, before finally joining the A7, towards Milan and Tuscany.

The highway has 78 tunnels between Genoa and Nice.

Route

References

Buildings and structures completed in 1967
Autostrade in Italy
Transport in Liguria